Giorgio Degola (9 August 1923 – 27 December 2018) was an Italian politician of the Christian Democrats.

Biography 
Degola was born on 9 August 1923 in Albinea to Giovanni Degola, an engineer, and the daughter of a Reggio landowner.

Degola would go on to become an industrialist, through the Degola and Ferretti firm, becoming one of the most important post-war building contractors. He was also a prominent leader of the football team, A.C. Reggiana 1919 in the 1950's and 1960's; sharing the vice presidency of the club with Gino Lari and Carlo Visconti.

Degola served as a Senator from 1976 to 1987 in the constituency of Emilia-Romagna as part of Christian Democracy.

He died in Albinea, Italy on 27 December 2018.

External links 

 Italian Senate Page

References

1923 births
2018 deaths

Senators of Legislature IX of Italy
Senators of Legislature VIII of Italy
Senators of Legislature VII of Italy
People from the Province of Reggio Emilia